Dadarsi was a Persian general satrap of Bactria. He served the Persian king Darius I the Great (522–486 BCE). He was ordered to suppress a revolt in Margiana.

References

Sources
 

Generals of Darius the Great
6th-century BC Iranian people
Achaemenid satraps of Bactria
Officials of Darius the Great